Arbroath railway station serves the town of Arbroath in Angus, Scotland. There are two crossovers at the north end of the station, which can be used to facilitate trains turning back if the line south to Carnoustie is blocked. ScotRail, who manage the station, provide most of the services, along with CrossCountry, London North Eastern Railway and Caledonian Sleeper.

History 

There have been three stations called "Arbroath", two of which closed in 1848. One - Arbroath Catherine Street - served the Arbroath and Forfar Railway; the other  - Arbroath Lady Loan or Arbroath West - was on the Dundee and Arbroath Railway. The current station was originally opened by the Dundee and Arbroath Railway on 1 February 1848 as a link station to connect the Arbroath and Forfar Railway with the Dundee and Arbroath Railway. On 1 October 1880 the North British, Arbroath and Montrose Railway opened north towards Montrose.

Jointly run by the London, Midland and Scottish Railway and the London and North Eastern Railway after the Grouping of 1923, the station then passed on to the Scottish Region of British Railways on nationalisation in 1948.

Until 1990, the station had 3 active platforms and was the terminus of a regular local service from Perth and Dundee that called at all of the intermediate local stations between the latter station and here. This was mostly withdrawn at the May 1990 timetable change (due to a low usage and a rolling stock shortage). The former platform 3 and its associated loop has also been taken out of use and lifted.

Facilities 
The station building is built above the railway line and platforms, and contains the ticket office, lifts to platforms and toilets. Outside is a taxi rank drop-off point. Each of the platforms has a waiting room, a help point and a bench, whilst platform 1 also has a ticket machine, which is adjacent to the car park.

Passenger volume 

The statistics cover twelve month periods that start in April.

Services 
London North Eastern Railway services to London King's Cross and CrossCountry routes towards England also stop at Arbroath. On Sundays there is generally an hourly service in each direction.

References

Bibliography

External links

 Station on navigable O.S. map.
 History of Station

Railway stations in Angus, Scotland
Former Dundee and Arbroath Railway stations
Railway stations in Great Britain opened in 1848
Railway stations served by ScotRail
Railway stations served by Caledonian Sleeper
Railway stations served by CrossCountry
Railway stations served by London North Eastern Railway
1848 establishments in Scotland
Arbroath